Kirsten Sødal (born 14 June 1935, dead 22 February 2022) was a Norwegian author who wrote several children's books, including Bestefar i spøkelsesbyen (Grandfather in the Ghost town) and the Birkebeinerbarn series.  She also worked on school work books På Sporet (On Track).

Early life
Kirsten Sødal (born Knudsen) was born in the coastal town Kristiansand in Norway.  When she was five years old, World War II broke out.  This influenced her writing greatly.  Her father was a part of the Norwegian resistance movement and contributed by writing secret newspapers with true news.  She wrote small stories and poems her entire life.

Bibliography
Her works include: Bestefar I spøkelsesbyen, the Birkebeinerbarn series, Kamelgutten (The Camel Boy), a Christmas story with one chapter for each day of advent, Med Benjamin til Bethlehem (With Benjamin to Bethlehem), another Christmas story based on a play, På Sporet, Alf, a book based on the childhood of one of her good friends, Alf Huseth. In 2010 she released a collection of poems she wrote after her husband's death, Takk for blomstene i livet.

Bestefar I spøkelsesbyen (Grandfather in the Ghost town), Lunde, 1996. 
Birkebeinerbarn (Birkebeiner Children), Verbum forlay, 1993. 
Kamelgutten (The Camel Boy), IKO-forl, 2017. 
Med Benjamin til Bethlehem (With Benjamin to Bethlehem), Verbum forlay, 1991. 
På Sporet (On Track)
Alf (2007), Stiftelsen Arkivet, 2007. 
Takk for blomstene i livet (Thank You for the Flowers of a Lifetime) (2010)

External links
Stiftelsen Arkivet Bokutgivelser
Kamelgutten
Aschehoug

1935 births
Living people
People from Kristiansand
Norwegian children's writers
20th-century Norwegian women writers
21st-century Norwegian women writers
Norwegian women children's writers